Letipea Landscape Conservation Area is a nature park is located in Lääne-Viru County, Estonia.

Its area is 609 ha.

The protected area was founded in 1992 as a Letipea bird conservation area. In 2000, the protected area was designated to the landscape conservation area.

References

Nature reserves in Estonia
Geography of Lääne-Viru County